Jhalokati-2 is a constituency represented in the Jatiya Sangsad (National Parliament) of Bangladesh since 2008 by Amir Hossain Amu of the Awami League.

Boundaries 
The constituency encompasses Jhalokati Sadar and Nalchity upazilas.
It is known as the centre point and trade body for the entire division as it consists of the most efficient routes connecting to all districts of the division.

History 
The constituency was created in 1984 from a Bakerganj constituency when the former Bakerganj District was split into four districts: Bhola, Bakerganj, Jhalokati, and Pirojpur.

Members of Parliament

Elections

Elections in the 2010s 
Amir Hossain Amu was re-elected unopposed in the 2014 general election after opposition parties withdrew their candidacies in a boycott of the election.

Elections in the 2000s 

Zulfiker Ali Bhutto died in May 2000. Israt Sultana Elen Bhutto, his widow, was elected in a July 2000 by-election, defeating Amir Hossain Amu.

Elections in the 1990s

References

External links
 

Parliamentary constituencies in Bangladesh
Jhalokati District